MacDade Boulevard station (formerly Collingdale) is SEPTA Route 102 trolley stop in Collingdale, Pennsylvania. The station is located on MacDade Boulevard. It is the last stop before Sharon Hill, and the last stop to run along Woodlawn Avenue. Trolleys arriving at this station travel between 69th Street Terminal in Upper Darby, Pennsylvania and Chester Pike down in Sharon Hill, Pennsylvania. The station has a shed with a roof where people can go inside when it is raining.

Between the MacDade Boulevard and Sharon Hill stops, CSX's Philadelphia Subdivision freight line bridge crosses over the tracks. The line dips very low under the freight line as a result, flooding occurs in the underpass with shuttle buses between the two stations being used as substitutes for trolley cars.

Station layout

References

External links

 Station from Google Maps Street View

SEPTA Media–Sharon Hill Line stations